Cityplace is a TIF District and neighborhood in Old East Dallas, Texas (USA) - near the Uptown area of Dallas, adjacent to the intersection of Central Expressway and Haskell Avenue/Blackburn Street. East of Central Expressway, the neighborhood includes the tree-lined Haskell boulevard and travels past the 42-story Tower at Cityplace. At 42-stories, it is the tallest building in Dallas outside downtown. Also on the east is the newer Cityville high-end apartment complex. The west side Cityplace includes the new-urbanist West Village and the northern end of the Uptown neighborhood.

Tallest Structures
Measuring by structural height, the tallest buildings in the Cityplace neighborhood are as follows:
 Tower at Cityplace 
 The Mondrian

Economy
On June 8, 2009 Dean Foods announced plans to move to the Tower at Cityplace in the first quarter of 2010.

Attractions
 Tower at Cityplace
 West Village

Education

Public (DISD)

High schools
North Dallas High School - AAAAA

Middle schools
 Rusk Middle School
 Alex W. Spence Middle School

Elementary schools
 Houston Elementary School

Private Schools
Holy Trinity Catholic School

Transportation

Streetcars
McKinney Avenue Transit Authority - the M-Line

Light rail
DART:  and 
Cityplace Station

Gallery

References

External links
 Cityplace TIF District
 West Village Website
 Historical maps of Cityplace neighborhood, circa 1880-1930 (includes Trolley routes)

Neighborhoods in Old East Dallas